Palestine, West Virginia may refer to:
Palestine, Greenbrier County, West Virginia, an unincorporated community in Greenbrier County
Palestine, Wirt County, West Virginia, an unincorporated community in Wirt County